Moore College of Art & Design is a private art school in Philadelphia, Pennsylvania. Its undergraduate programs are available only for female students, but its other educational programs, including graduate programs, are co-educational.

History
Founded in 1848 by Sarah Worthington Peter as the Philadelphia School of Design for Women, it was the first women's art school in the United States.  The school was established to prepare women to work in the new industries created during the Industrial Revolution of which Philadelphia was a center. The school occupied the Edwin Forrest Mansion at 1326 North Broad Street from 1880 to 1960. 

The first principal of the school was Anne Hill, who held the position from 1850 to 1852. She was followed by the artist Thomas Braidwood (1855-1873), who probably left due to disagreements with John Sartain, who served as Director for 28 years. Elizabeth Croasdale took over as principal from 1873 to 1886, followed by Emily Sartain (1886-1920). In 1929 the position was renamed dean, and Harriet Sartain took over from 1920 to 1946. Additional deans are listed in the book Moore College of Art & Design by Sharon G. Hoffman with Amanda M. Mott.

The institution was renamed Moore College of Art & Design in 1932 after Joseph Moore, Jr. set up a $3 Million dollar endowment in memory of his parents. The endowment was used to found the Moore Institute of Art, Science and Industry when it merged with the Philadelphia School of Art & Design.

Moore now offers nine undergraduate programs including Art Education, Fashion Design, Fine Arts, Graphic Design, Illustration, Animation & Game Arts, Interior Design, Photography & Digital Arts, and Film & Digital Cinema, each leading to a Bachelor of Fine Arts (BFA).

Moore has approximately 500 women enrolled in its all-female undergraduate BFA program. Co-educational graduate programs, post-Baccalaureate programs as well as adult continuing education and a Young Artists Workshop are open to people of all ages.

Academics
The college offers nine undergraduate majors, twelve minors, one post-baccalaureate program, three graduate programs, in addition to continuing education programs for adults and youth.

The Galleries at Moore
The Galleries at Moore are open to the public and free of charge.

Notable people

Alumnae
Contemporary:
 Kate Bartoldus, sculptor, set designer (The Sixth Sense, 12 Monkeys, Unbreakable, Chasing Amy),
 Janet Biggs, video artist
 Betty Bowes, painter
 Mona Brody, printmaker
 Kathy Butterly, sculptor
 Karen Hartley-Nagle, former Congressional candidate
 Amy Ignatow, illustrator and author of The Popularity Papers series of children's books.
Judith Joy Ross, Photographer, recipient of a Guggenheim Fellowship.
 Alice Neel, artist
 Margie Palatini, author of children's literature
 Polly Smith , Emmy Award-winning costume designer, Jim Henson, The Muppets.
 Dom Streater, fashion designer, Winner of Project Runway (Season 12), and Project Runway All Stars (season 5)
 Sharon Wohlmuth, Pulitzer-prize winning photographer
Pink (singer) Singer/Songwriter [dropped out]
 Adrienne Vittadini, fashion designer
1848 to 1900s
 Mary-Russell Ferrell Colton, artist, author, educator 
 Elizabeth Shippen Green, illustrator
 Bessie Pease Gutmann, children's book and magazine cover illustrator from the early 1900s
 Laura Marie Greenwood, painter
 Anne Parrish, novelist and children's author
 Esther Richards, first woman to design US postage stamp
Anna Russell Jones, textile and graphic designer and medical illustrator
 Jessie Willcox Smith, illustrator

Others
 Elliott Cresson, first president of the board of directors
 Sheila Levrant de Bretteville, honorary degree recipient
 Beatrice Fenton, sculptor and faculty member (1942–1953)
 Moe Brooker, painter and faculty member (1995- )
 Daniel Garber, painter and faculty member (1907–1909)
 Robert Henri, painter and faculty member (1891–?)
 Samuel Murray, sculptor and faculty member (1890–1941)
 Simon Nicholson, artist and teacher from 1964 to 1966
 Lizbeth Stewart (1948-2013), American ceramist (BFA 1971)
 Lowery Stokes Sims, honorary degree recipient
Barbara Blondeau, experimental photographer and faculty member

See also

 Edwin Forrest House
 Women's College Coalition

References

External links

 
Universities and colleges in Philadelphia
Art schools in Pennsylvania
Design schools in the United States
Women's universities and colleges in the United States
Educational institutions established in 1848
Italianate architecture in Pennsylvania
Logan Square, Philadelphia
1848 establishments in Pennsylvania
Private universities and colleges in Pennsylvania